"Hey Baby" is a 1975 rock single from the album Ted Nugent, the first solo release by American guitarist Ted Nugent. The song features lead vocals by rhythm guitarist Derek St. Holmes, and was the only song on the album that St. Holmes wrote and arranged himself.

Charts

See also

1975 in music
Ted Nugent discography

References

1975 songs
1975 singles
Blues rock songs
Epic Records singles
Song recordings produced by Tom Werman
Ted Nugent songs